Arizona, a state in the southwestern region of the United States of America, is known for its high population of Native Americans. Arizona has the third highest number (and the sixth highest percentage) of Native Americans of any state in the Union (See Demographics of Arizona). Out of the entire US population of 2.9 million Native Americans, roughly 286,680 live in Arizona, representing 10% of the country's total Native American population. Only California and Oklahoma have more Native Americans than Arizona by number. Arizona also has the highest proportion of land allocated to Native American reservations, at 28%. Arizona has five of the twelve largest Indian reservations in the United States, including the largest, the Navajo Nation, and the third-largest, the Tohono O'odham Nation. Also, Arizona has the largest number of Native American language speakers in the United States.

Distribution
There are twelve Native American languages spoken in Arizona, in addition to three other languages that are primarily spoken outside the state and one language with a disputed existence.

Population estimates are based on figures from Ethnologue and U.S. Census data, as given in sub-pages below. The twelve languages are shown in the table below:

Other minority Native American languages

In addition to the languages listed in the table above, there are three other Native American languages spoken in Arizona that are primarily found in New Mexico, located immediately to the east:
 Zuni is a language isolate spoken primarily in the Zuni Pueblo, which is located in northern New Mexico. Out of the approximately 10,000 people that form the Zuni tribe, only 538 live in Arizona, located on trust lands in Apache County. Unlike many other Native American languages, a vast majority of Zuni are able to speak their language, and Zuni is at a comparatively lower risk of extinction.
 Tewa is a Tanoan language spoken by the Tewa people of New Mexico. The Arizona Tewa are a group of Tewa that currently reside on the Hopi reservation of northeastern Arizona, primarily in two villages around First Mesa: Hano and Polacca. The Tewa language is considered endangered.
 Mescalero-Chiricahua is a Southern Athabaskan language spoken by the Chiricahua people and Mescalero people, two Apachean tribes that currently reside on the Fort Sill Apache Tribe lands in Oklahoma and the Mescalero Indian Reservation in southwestern New Mexico. A few Chiricahua also live on the San Carlos Apache Indian Reservation in southeastern Arizona, but this language is a minority language on the reservation.

See also
 Native Americans in the United States
 Indigenous peoples of Arizona
 Indigenous languages of the Americas
 Uto-Aztecan languages
 Yuman languages
 Southern Athabaskan languages

References

 
Indigenous languages of the Southwestern United States
Native American history of Arizona